The 21st Rifle Corps was a corps of the Soviet Red Army. It was part of the Western Front. It took part in the Great Patriotic War.

The headquarters formed in the Moscow Military District in September 1939. Assigned to the WSMD with the 17th, 24th, and 37th Rifle Divisions. The commander was Major General Vladimir Borisovich Borisov.

The corps was disbanded in summer 1945.

References

Citations

Bibliography 

 
 
 

Rifle corps of the Soviet Union